Mark Ruffalo is an American actor and film producer who has starred in numerous films and television series. Ruffalo made his acting debut in an episode of CBS Summer Playhouse. He began collaborating with Kenneth Lonergan and appeared in several of his plays, In 1996 he was included in the original cast of  Lonergan's play This Is Our Youth (1996) which gained him recognition subsequently he had minor roles in films including The Dentist (1996), Safe Men (1998) and Ang Lee's Civil War Western Ride with the Devil (1999). In 2000, he starred as Laura Linney's character's brother in Lonergan's Academy Award-nominated film You Can Count on Me.

In the mid-2000s, he was featured in the films View From the Top (2002), 13 Going on 30 (2004), Just Like Heaven (2005) and Rumor Has It (2005). In 2006, Ruffalo starred in Awake and Sing! for which he was nominated for a Tony Award for Best Featured Actor in a Play. In 2007, he appeared in David Fincher's mystery thriller Zodiac which was based on a true story. He played the role of SFPD inspector Dave Toschi, who ran the investigation to find and apprehend the Zodiac killer.

In 2012, he replaced Edward Norton in the role of Dr. Bruce Banner / Hulk in the Marvel Studios film The Avengers (2012). He later reprised the role in Iron Man 3 (2013), Avengers: Age of Ultron (2015), Thor: Ragnarok (2017), Avengers: Infinity War (2018), Captain Marvel (2019), Avengers: Endgame (2019), and Shang-Chi and the Legend of the Ten Rings (2021), as well as the Disney+ series What If…? (2021) and She-Hulk: Attorney at Law.
(2022). He also starred in the Now You See Me film series and in the 2014 biographical drama film Foxcatcher as Dave Schultz which earned him best Supporting Actor nominations for an Academy Award, BAFTA Award, Golden Globe and Screen Actors Guild Award. The next year in 2015, he appeared as journalist Michael Rezendes in the drama film Spotlight, for which he earned his third Academy Award nomination and a BAFTA Award nomination.

Film

Television

Theatre

References

Male actor filmographies
American filmographies